The Hrvatski nogometni kup, also colloquially known as Rabuzinovo sunce, is an annually held football tournament for Croatian football clubs and is the second most important competition in Croatian football after the HNL championship. It is governed by the Croatian Football Federation (HNS) and usually runs from late August to late May. Cup winners automatically qualify for next season's UEFA Europa Conference League, except when cup winners are also Prva HNL champions, in which case their berth in the Europa Conference League goes to the best placed team in the Prva HNL who haven't qualified for the UEFA competitions through their league performance.

The cup was established in 1992, after Croatian clubs had abandoned the Yugoslav First League and Yugoslav Cup competitions following the breakup of Yugoslavia. As of the most recent 2021–22 season a total of 31 cup seasons were held. The competition has historically been dominated by the two Eternal Derby sides—the most successful club is Dinamo Zagreb (formerly known in the 1990s as HAŠK Građanski and Croatia Zagreb) who appeared in 23 finals and won 16 titles, followed by Hajduk Split who won 7 titles out of 12 finals they appeared in.

Either Dinamo or Hajduk appeared in all but three cup finals (in 1999, 2006 and 2020) and only three other clubs have won the cup—Rijeka (six wins), Inter Zaprešić (one win) and Osijek (one win). Although clubs can qualify for the cup via regional county cups, which are usually contested by second-, third- or fourth-level sides, Uljanik Pula in 2003 was the only team in the history of the competition to have reached the cup final from outside the top level.

Format

Entries
Although in theory any club can take part in the cup, 48 teams enter the competition proper, based on three criteria:
Top sixteen best-ranked teams according to club coefficient calculated by the Croatian Football Federation which take into account their cup records in the previous five seasons
Twenty-one club winners of regional cups organised in each of 21 counties of Croatia
Eleven regional cup finalists, from the top 11 counties with the greatest number of active football clubs registered

Competition system
The 32 clubs which qualify via regional cups always enter in the preliminary round, which consists of 16 single-legged fixtures. In case of a draw at the end of normal time, thirty minutes of extra time is played, and if scores are still level, a penalty shootout is held to determine the winner of the tie.
Sixteen winners of the preliminary ties go on to the first round proper (round of 32), where they are joined by the sixteen best-ranked clubs according to cup coefficient (this usually means all First League clubs and a handful of best-ranked lower level teams). Round of 32 (R1) and round of 16 (R2) are also played as single-legged fixtures. Until the 2014–15 season, from the quarter-finals onward, the competition employed a two-legged tie format, with winners progressing through on aggregate score. Since 2015–16, quarter-finals are also played as single-legged fixtures and, since 2017–18, the same applies for semi-finals.
In case the score is still level at the end of regular time, extra time is played. If the score remains level after extra time, a penalty shootout takes place to determine tie winners. With the exception of 1997 and 1999 finals, all finals were also played as two-legged fixtures until the rules were most recently changed for the 2014–15 season and a single-match final was made permanent.

Croatian club cup coefficient
Clubs are awarded points for participation in specific round of the Cup. There are two exceptions in awarding points, first is clubs from preliminary round doesn't receive any points and second is a final where winner receives double of runner up. Points are summed through the season and added to five year ranking.

Points used in this ranking will be used for qualification for the 2023–24 season and seeding for the season 2022–23.

List of winners

Key

List of winners

Results by team

Winning managers

By individual

Footnotes

A.  Originally called Dinamo Zagreb, the club was renamed "HAŠK Građanski" in 1992, and then again "Croatia Zagreb" in the winter break of the 1992–93 season. The club reverted to its original name in February 2000.
B.  Inter Zaprešić was known by its sponsored name "Inker Zaprešić" (sometimes spelled "INKER") from 1991 to 2003.
C.  Varaždin were known as "Varteks" from 1958 to 2010.
D.  Istra 1961 was formerly known as "Uljanik Pula" (before 2003), "Pula 1856" (2003–05), "Pula Staro Češko" (2005–06), and "NK Pula" (2006–07) before adopting their current name in 2007. They are not to be confused with their cross-city rivals NK Istra.
E.  Slaven Belupo based in Koprivnica were formerly known as "Slaven" until 1992. From 1992 to 1994 they were called "Slaven Bilokalnik" before adopting their current name for sponsorship reasons. Since UEFA does not approve sponsored club names, the club is listed as "Slaven Koprivnica" in European competitions and on UEFA's website.
F.  Vahid Halilhodžić was in charge of Dinamo Zagreb in the first leg of 2011 Croatian Football Cup Final.

References

External links
Croatian Football Cup results at Sportnet.hr  
Cup at UEFA
League321.com - National cup results.

 
National association football cups
Cup
Recurring sporting events established in 1992
1992 establishments in Croatia